Chookiat Sakveerakul, born 1981 in Chiang Mai, Thailand) is a Thai film director and screenwriter. He is also credited as Ma-Deaw Chukiatsakwirakul or Matthew Chukiat Sakwirakul.

Chookiat's first feature-length film was an ensemble drama, The Passenger of Li, which was an independent production. His next film was Pisaj, a 2004 horror film produced by Sahamongkol Film International. Chookiat garnered critical acclaim for this next film, 13 Beloved, a gritty drama about a deadly underground reality television game, which won several awards in Thailand and from film festivals.

He graduated from Montfort College in Chiang Mai.

Filmography

Writer
Body (Co-writer with Paween Purikitpanya) (2007)
Chocolate (Co-writer with Nepalee Sakveerakul) (2008)

Director
4 Romance (Segment "Dream/Fun" ) (2008)

Writer & Director
The Passenger of Li
Pisaj (Evil) (2004)
13 Beloved (2006)
The Love of Siam (2007)
Home: Love, Happiness, Remembrance (2012)
Grean Fictions (2013)
The Eyes Diary (2014)
Dew, Let's Go Together (2019)

References

External links

1982 births
Living people
Chookiat Sakveerakul
Chookiat Sakveerakul
Chookiat Sakveerakul
Chookiat Sakveerakul
Chookiat Sakveerakul
Chookiat Sakveerakul